Dávid Horváth (born 16 May 1996) is a Hungarian swimmer. He competed in the men's 200 metre breaststroke event at the 2016 Summer Olympics. In 2014, he represented Hungary at the 2014 Summer Youth Olympics held in Nanjing, China.

References

External links
 

1996 births
Living people
Hungarian male swimmers
Olympic swimmers of Hungary
Swimmers at the 2016 Summer Olympics
Place of birth missing (living people)
Swimmers at the 2014 Summer Youth Olympics
Male breaststroke swimmers
Swimmers from Budapest
20th-century Hungarian people
21st-century Hungarian people